Joseph Joanovici (also Ioinovici or Joinovici, 1905 –1965) was a French merchant of scrap metal who supplied both Nazi Germany and the French Resistance during the German occupation of France in World War II.

Early life
Joseph Joanovici was born on 20 February 1905 in Chișinău, then part of the Russian Empire, now the capital of Moldova. That same year he became orphaned after his parents were killed during the 1905 Chișinău pogrom. He married a fellow orphan named Eva and in 1925 emigrated to France, settling in a northern suburb of Paris.

He got his starts in the scrap metal business by accepting a low-level job at his wife’s uncle business. Despite the fact that he was illiterate, and would remain so until late in his life, Joanovici was adept at running a business and pushed the uncle out and took over with the help of his brother, Marcel. He soon began supplying the Nazi regime in neighboring Germany with metal, which increased his fortune and made him a millionaire.

According to various sources, he also developed close dealings with the French mafia.

World War II 
During World War II, Joanovici collaborated with Nazi Germany, while also supplying his goods to the Resistance. He was deemed an "economically worthwhile Jew" by the occupying forces, which spared him the fate of other Jews in Nazi-occupied France. In 1941 he was arrested by the German authorities for selling defective materials to the Nazi-owned WIFO company. Later, during his trial, he characterized this and other instances as acts of wartime sabotage against the Germans. He spent several months in captivity, before managing to use bribes to obtain his release. Around this time he also became associated with Henri Lafont, one the leaders of the Carlingue, which greatly increased his standing within occupied France.

Joanovici used his wealth and the privileges he enjoyed as an associate of the Carlingue to support the Resistance in several ways, such as bribing German officials into releasing a number of potential deportation victims and using his papers of safe-page to transport weapons to Resistance members in Paris. In addition, credible claims have been made that he was a principal financier of the insurrection that resulted in the Liberation of Paris.

Immediately after liberation, Joanovici evaded arrest and began testifying against other collaborationists, most notably Pierre Bonny and Henri Lafont, the leaders of the Carlingue. For years, he had been financing a Resistance network inside the Paris Police Prefecture, named Honneur de la Police, and by the time the war was over, he was on such intimate terms with the police that he enjoyed his own office at the Prefecture and was awarded the Resistance Medal.

Other institutions were less fond of his wartime activities, with Roger Wybot, the head of French counter-intelligence, in particular seeking his arrest. Aided by employees of the Prefecture, he managed to avoid arrest by fleeing to the American-occupied zone of Germany.

Arrest and imprisonment 
After attempting to return to France, Joanovici was finally arrested in 1947 and accused of treason. Wybot accused the Paris Police Prefecture of protecting him and delaying his arrest. The ensuing scandal lead to the resignation of Charles Luizet, the police prefect.

During his 1949 trial, at least 27 individuals testified that they were released from German captivity due to Joanovici's intervention. These testimonies, along with his support for the Honneur de la Police, his role in the capture of Bonny and Lafont, and his Resistance Medal, contributed to his exoneration on charges of intelligence with the enemy. He was, however, found guilty of economic collaboration, for which he was sentenced to five years in prison, as well as confiscation of his property. Since the annexation of his native Bessarabia by Romania during the war made his nationality uncertain, he avoided deportation. Furthermore, his poor health rendered him no longer suitable for a prison environment, so the decision was made to keep him under house arrest in a hotel room in the southern town of Mende. Using the telephone in his hotel room, he was able to rebuild his fortune in the scrap-metal trade and became a very visible philanthropist who enjoyed immense popularity in Mende.

In January 1957, he fled France and sought refuge in Israel using a fake passport. After the Israeli authorities became aware of his fake documentation and the false pretenses under which he entered the country, his permit of residence was not renewed, and he was forced to return to France in late 1958. There he was once again arrested and subjected to a trial, which resulted in his acquittal of most of the charges and finally being sentenced to one year in prison.

He was released in 1962 and moved to Clichy, where he died in relative poverty on 7 February 1965, aged 59.

Legacy 
Joanovici's dealings with both the occupying German forces and the French Resistance during the war led to a mixed legacy both during his lifetime and after his death. Both historical and fictional depictions of Joanovici vary immensely, creating a complicated modern image which philosopher Jeffrey Mehlman described as "an almost unfathomable bundle of contradictions".

While sometimes described as a shady, corrupt and unscrupulous businessman who did not shy away from collaborating with the Nazis, commentators have also noted his efforts as a means to survive under the anti-semitic regime. According to the Times of Israel, "the most amazing aspect of Joanovici’s story is that he managed to survive the war when many other French Jewish profiteers, such as the infamous Michel (Mandel) Szkolnikoff, met a violent end. Joanovici emerged from the war as a hero to some and a traitor to others — but by all counts, very much alive".

Popular culture
In 1998 the French writer Alphonse Boudard published the novel L'étrange Monsieur Joseph based on Joseph's life. In 2001 it was adapted as a TV film of the same name, directed by Josée Dayan from a script by Éric-Emmanuel Schmitt, with Roger Hanin as Joseph Joanovici. The adaptations was criticised for what was perceived as an over-sympathetic portrayal of Joanovici.

Between 2007 and 2012 a six-volume graphic novel by Fabien Nury and Sylvain Vallée titled “Il était une fois en France” was published, dealing with his exploits during the war. An omnibus edition was released in 2015. An English translation was released in 2019 under the title "Once Upon a Time in France".

References

1905 births
1965 deaths
Businesspeople from Chișinău
People from Kishinyovsky Uyezd
Moldovan Jews
Bessarabian Jews
Romanian emigrants to France
French industrialists
French collaborators with Nazi Germany
Prisoners and detainees of France
Jewish collaborators with Nazi Germany